Watchem is a town in north western Victoria, Australia.

Watchem has a thriving lake based within walking distance from the town centre. The Watchem lake is beautiful with its rural and tranquil setting.

The Post Office opened on 2 November 1889.

With its neighbouring township Birchip, Watchem has a football team (Birchip-Watchem) competing in the North Central Football League.

History 

There are many stories told on how the name Watchem came to be.

One of the more plausible stories being that the name came from the Aboriginal name for wattle that has been known to grow near the Watchem lake.

Another story is that Watchem came from the aboriginal word “place the hop bush (Dodonaea) grows”

However the name came to be the town according to early documentation such as “land Department maps, road surveys and building applications” has been around since at least the 1860s.

The land was also home to the Banynong tribe who were situated along the Watchem lake area.

According to early documentation the first “land selection”  was done by the Donohue family in 1873. Martin Donohue in 1874 actually did the first wool clip for this area he did it from Watchem to Ballarat. Following on from this he also did the first wheat delivery to Dunolly in 1875.

By 1875 that is when the spike in population hit with plenty more families moving to the area some in which are still located there today.

By the end of 1875 the town Watchem was officially recognised and gained township.

Watchem Lake 

The Watchem Lake is located 3 km west of Watchem on the Warracknabeal road  and consists of a playground, camping places, a BBQ area and the lake.

The Watchem lake was update in 2018 the updates finished on the 22nd of December right before Christmas. These updates made way for better campgrounds, toilets and a playground.

Watchem pool 

The Watchem pool is another major attraction to this small town, the appeal comes from many places.

This swimming pool is free admission to anyone, no memberships, no gold coin just show up with a towel and suitable swimwear.

The Watchem swimming complex is completely outdoors although it still offers seated arrangements under the shade. The other areas of this complex include a shower and bathroom area and an office station where spare swimming equipment is kept.

This swimming complex has three different size swimming pools; a baby pool, a smaller child's pool and the main pool which has both a shallow and a deep end to it.

Watchem pub 
The Watchem Pub is located near the centre of the small town. The Watchem pub was founded in 1893 and it offers a comfortable country feel.

The pub offer a wide variety of different meals and drinks to go along with the food, such as fish, steak and chicken just to name a few. The pub is opened on Fridays, Saturdays and Sundays trading hours may vary.

References

External links

Towns in Victoria (Australia)